John Cornelius Sleeuwenhoek (26 February 1944 – 20 July 1989) was an English professional footballer who played as a centre half. He made 269 appearances in the Football League, mainly for Aston Villa, and was capped twice for England U23.

Sleeuwenhoek was born in Wednesfield, Staffordshire, the son of a Dutch paratrooper. He started his football career as a junior with Aston Villa, turning professional in 1961, and played regularly for the club for six seasons. While at the club he won two caps for England at under-23 level, and also played for a representative Football League XI. He then moved to Birmingham City, but recurrent knee problems dogged his later career. After spells at Torquay United and Oldham Athletic he retired from professional football at the early age of 28.

He was affectionately known as 'Tulip' due to his Dutch roots.

He died in Birmingham in July 1989, aged 45.

References
Club statistics

Specific

1944 births
People from Wednesfield
1989 deaths
English footballers
Association football central defenders
Aston Villa F.C. players
Birmingham City F.C. players
Torquay United F.C. players
Oldham Athletic A.F.C. players
England under-23 international footballers
English Football League players
English Football League representative players
English people of Dutch descent